The British International Motor Show is an annual motor show held by the Society of Motor Manufacturers and Traders between 1903 and 2008 in England, and as The British Motor Show since 2021 by Automotion Events.

Initially held in London at The Crystal Palace, Olympia and then the Earls Court Exhibition Centre, it moved to the National Exhibition Centre in Birmingham in 1978, where it stayed until 2004. It was held at ExCeL London in 2006 and 2008 and now based in Farnborough (Hampshire) at the airport exhibition centre.

The 2010 and 2012 events were cancelled due to the global financial crisis.

Between 2016 and 2019 there were annual motor shows held under the London Motor Show banner.

The show returned in 2021 to Farnborough under the banner of The British Motor Show and was the first international motor show event to take place after the lifting of coronavirus measures. The event recorded  45,000 visitors in its first year returning, and proceeded to grow to almost 60,000 visitors in 2022

The British Motor Show is committed to a presence at Farnborough until at least 2025 and will now become an annual event as opposed to its previous bi-annual format.

History
Britain's first motor show—for horseless carriages—was held in South Kensington in 1896 at the Imperial Institute under the auspices of Lawson's Motor Car Club.

In 1905, it moved to Olympia, London, where it was held for the next 32 years before moving to the Earls Court Exhibition Centre from 1937 until 1976, except for the period of World War II during which time there were no shows. From 1978 until 2004, it was held every second year at the National Exhibition Centre (NEC), Birmingham, with the 2004 event being held in May, rather than the traditional October, to avoid a clash with the Paris Motor Show. The 1980 event was attended by both the actor Lewis Collins and the stand-up comedian Stewart Lee.

The July 2006 and July 2008 shows were held at ExCeL London. The 2010 and 2012 shows were cancelled due to the global financial crisis.

Between 2016 and 2019 there were annual motor shows held under the London Motor Show banner.

Britain returned to the international motor show stage in 2021 with The British Motor Show held at Farnborough International.

Locations

Earls Court
The cars listed are those announced in the late summer lead up to the show or during it. Manufacturers did announce other cars at times to suit them and as that practice grew the public lost interest and the motor show finished its long run in the middle of the 1970s.

Birmingham

ExCeL

See also
 British motor industry
 London Motor Show

References and notes

SMMT history including that of the motor show
 – Source of show locations and dates

External links

Archived website of the British Motor Show

Auto shows in the United Kingdom
Automotive industry in the United Kingdom
1903 establishments in England
Recurring events established in 1903
2008 disestablishments in England
Recurring events disestablished in 2008